A list of films produced in South Korea in 1991:

External links
1991 in South Korea

 1991-1995 at www.koreanfilm.org

1991
South Korean
1991 in South Korea